The subdivisions of Belfast are a series of divisions of Belfast, Northern Ireland that are used for a variety of cultural, electoral, planning and residential purposes.

The city is traditionally divided into four main areas based on the cardinal points of a compass, each of which form the basis of constituencies for general elections: North Belfast, East Belfast, South Belfast, and West Belfast. These four areas meet at Belfast City Centre. The second traditional divide is that formed by the River Lagan, with the northern bank of the River being part of County Antrim, while the southern bank is part of County Down.

The city's subdivisions reflect the divided nature of Northern Ireland as a whole, with areas tending to be highly segregated, especially in working-class neighbourhoods. Walls known as peace lines, originally erected by the British Army after August 1969, divide fourteen inner city neighbourhoods.

Townlands 
 
The townlands of Belfast are the oldest surviving land divisions in the city. The city's townlands are split between the two traditional counties by the River Lagan, with those townlands north of the river generally in County Antrim, while those on the southern bank are generally part of County Down.  Most of these townlands are older than the city itself, and most of their names are derived from the Irish language. As the city grew, these once-rural townlands were built upon and their boundaries became obscured. However, many of the city's streets, roads and housing estates have been named after them.

Electoral wards

The electoral wards of Belfast are subdivisions of the city, used primarily for statistics and elections. Belfast has had 51 wards since May 1973, which were revised in May 1985 and again in May 1993. Wards are the smallest administrative unit in Northern Ireland and are set by the Local Government Boundaries Commissioner and reviewed every 8–10 years.

The wards were redrawn for the 2014 elections.  

In elections to Belfast City Council, the 51 wards are split into nine District Electoral Areas (DEAs), each of which contains between five and seven wards, with the number of councillors it elects equal to the number of wards it contains. The current DEAs are:

 Balmoral (6 wards)
 Castle (6 wards)
 Court (5 wards)
 Laganbank (5 wards)
 Lower Falls (5 wards)
 Oldpark (6 wards)
 Pottinger (6 wards)
 Upper Falls (5 wards)
 Ormiston (formerly Victoria) (7 wards)

Constituencies
Belfast's electoral wards are used to create constituencies for elections to the Northern Ireland Assembly and the House of Commons of the United Kingdom. These constituencies are coterminous and are created by amalgamating wards into larger areas, with the city's 51 wards split between the four 'Belfast' constituencies, each of which contains between 11 and 14 wards, although these also contain wards from bordering local authorities. These constituencies follow the tradition of referring to parts of Belfast by the four cardinal directions:

 Belfast East
 Belfast East (Assembly)
 Belfast East (parliamentary)

 Belfast North
 Belfast North (Assembly)
 Belfast North (parliamentary)

 Belfast South
 Belfast South (Assembly)
 Belfast South (parliamentary)

 Belfast West
 Belfast West (Assembly)
 Belfast West (parliamentary)

Cultural quarters

The Belfast Quarters refer to a number of distinctive cultural zones within the city of Belfast, whose identities have been developed as a spur to tourism and urban regeneration. These "quarters" differ from the districts into which Belfast is divided.

The term "quarter" does not refer to one fourth (or one quarter) of the city, nor is every area in the centre of Belfast part of one of the quarters. Instead, each "quarter" reflects something about a neighbourhood's history and locale, with the "Quarter" label being something that has come into general use in recent years.

The quarters are as follows:
Cathedral Quarter
Gaeltacht Quarter
Linen Quarter
Market Quarter
Queen's Quarter
Smithfield and Union Quarter
Titanic Quarter
Library Quarter
Station Quarter (Planned)

Postcodes of Belfast 

Belfast city centre is divided into two postcode districts, BT1 for the area lying north of the City Hall, and BT2 for the area to its south. The industrial estate and docklands BT3. The rest of the Belfast post town is divided in a broadly clockwise system. Although BT derives from Belfast, the BT postcode area extends across the whole of Northern Ireland.

 Belfast City Centre
 BT1 North of Belfast City Hall
 BT2 South of Belfast City Hall
 BT3 Industrial district

 East and South East of Belfast City Hall
 BT4 East Belfast
 BT5 East Belfast / Castlereagh
 BT6 East Belfast / Castlereagh

 South and South West of Belfast City Hall
 BT7 South Belfast
 BT8 Outer South Belfast
 BT9 South Belfast

 West South West and West of Belfast City Hall
 BT10 South Belfast
 BT11 West Belfast
 BT12 West Belfast
 BT17 Outer South West Belfast / Dunmurry

 West North West and North of Belfast City Hall
 BT13 West Belfast
 BT14 Outer North West Belfast
 BT15 North Belfast

Other areas of Belfast

General
 Belfast Metropolitan Area
 Belfast City Centre
 The Golden Mile
 The Holyland

Housing estates
 Ballybeen
 Braniel
 Clarawood
 Taughmonagh

Streets and roads
 Antrim Road
 Belmont Road
 Castlereagh Road
 Cluan Place
 Crumlin Road
  Cregagh Road 
 Donegall Road
 Falls Road
 Holywood Road
 Lisburn Road
 Malone Road
 Newtownards Road
 Ormeau Road
 Ravenhill Road
 Sandy Row
 Shankill Road
 Shaw's Road
 Shore Road
 Short Strand
 Springfield Road
 Stranmillis Road
 Westlink
 Woodstock Road
 Whitewell Road

References

 

ko:그레이터 벨파스트
rmy:Baro Belfast